Curitiba brunni is a species of beetle in the family Cerambycidae, the only species in the genus Curitiba.

References

Prioninae